The 2017–18 UNC Wilmington Seahawks men's basketball team represented the University of North Carolina at Wilmington during the 2017–18 NCAA Division I men's basketball season. The Seahawks were led by first-year head coach C. B. McGrath and played their home games at the Trask Coliseum as members of the Colonial Athletic Association. They finished the season 11–21, 7–11 in CAA play to finish in sixth place. They defeated Hofstra in the quarterfinals of the CAA tournament before losing in the semifinals to Northeastern.

Previous season
The Seahawks finished the 2016–17 season 29–6, 15–3 in CAA play to win the regular season championship. They defeated Delaware, William & Mary, and the College of Charleston to win the CAA tournament. As a result, they earned the conference's automatic bid to the NCAA tournament for the second consecutive year. As the No. 12 seed in the East region, they lost in the first round to Virginia.

On March 17, 2017, head coach Kevin Keatts left the school to accept the head coaching position at NC State. On April 3, the school hired C.B. McGrath as head coach.

Offseason

Departures

Incoming transfers

Under NCAA transfer rules, Cylla sat out for the 2017–18 season, and had two years of remaining eligibility.

Recruiting class of 2017

Preseason 
In a poll of league coaches, media relations directors, and media members at the CAA's media day, the Seahawks were picked to finish in fifth place in the CAA. Junior forward Devontae Cacok was named to the preseason All-CAA first team.

Roster

Schedule and results

|-
!colspan=9 style=| Non-conference regular season
|-

|-
!colspan=9 style=| CAA regular season

|-
!colspan=9 style=| CAA tournament

References

UNC Wilmington Seahawks men's basketball seasons
UNC Wilmington